The Zlatni Rat, often referred to as the Golden Cape or Golden Horn (translated from the local Chakavian dialect), is a spit of land located about  west from the harbour town of Bol on the southern coast of the Croatian island of Brač, in the region of Dalmatia. It extends southward into the Hvar Channel, a body of water in the Adriatic Sea between the islands of Brač and Hvar, which is home to strong currents. The landform itself is mostly composed of a white pebble beach, with a Mediterranean pine grove taking up the remainder.

Zlatni Rat has been regularly listed as one of the top beaches in Europe. Its distinctive shape can be seen in many travel brochures, which made it one of the symbols of Croatian tourism. In 2008 Red Bull organized Red Bull Golden Jump, a unique kiteboarding competition in jumping/flying over the beach.

Description

The beaches on either side of the spit extend for some  altogether, but the exact shape and length of the landform varies with regard to changes in tide, current, and wind. The spit points directly south. The farthest end, which is usually turned slightly toward the east, will often shift to the west in certain weather conditions, esp. a strong south-easterly wind known in Croatia as the Jugo. Changes in the shape of the beach occur once in every two to three years, and have been observed in 2010, 2016 and 2018.

The surrounding waters are usually cool and clear, due to the current in the Hvar Channel. A reliable afternoon westerly wind known as a Maestral has made the beach a destination for windsurfers.

The pine tree grove which borders the beach is home to the remnants of a Roman villa rustica, which included a swimming pool. The westernmost edge of the beach, and several coves to the west of the main beach, are traditionally clothing-optional. The promontory is protected as a geomorphological phenomenon.

See also
 Bol, Croatia
 Dalmatia
 Brač
 Adriatic Sea

References

Bol, Croatia
Beaches of Croatia
Brač
Spits of Europe
Landforms of Split-Dalmatia County